Lee, I, or Yi is the second-most-common surname in Korea, behind Kim (김). Historically, 李 was officially written as Ni  in Korea. The spelling officially changed to I in 1933 when the initial sound rule was established. In North Korea, it is romanized as Ri because there is no distinction between the alveolar liquids /l/ and /r/ in modern Korean. As of the South Korean census of 2015, there were 7,306,828 people by this name in South Korea or 14.7% of the population.

Latin-alphabet spelling
Though the official Revised Romanization spelling of this surname is I, South Korea's National Institute of the Korean Language noted in 2001 that one-letter surnames were quite rare in English and other foreign languages and could cause difficulties when traveling abroad. However, the NIKL still hoped to promote systemic transcriptions for use in passports, and thus recommended that people who bore this surname should spell it Yi in the Roman alphabet.

However, the majority of South Koreans with this surname continue to spell it as Lee, because conditions for changing passport names are strict. In a study based on 2007 application data for South Korean passports, it was found that 98.5% of people with this surname spelled it in Latin letters as "Lee" in their passports, while only 1.0% spelled it "Yi".

A few people with this surname historically spelled it Ye, as in Ye Wanyong of the Korean Empire. Rhee has also been used, as in Syngman Rhee and Simon Hang-bock Rhee.

Clans

As with all Korean family names, the holders of the Yi surname are divided into patrilineal clans, or lineages, known in Korean as bon-gwan, based on their ancestral seat. Most such clans trace their lineage back to a specific founder, and are generally not related to one another. This system was at its height under the yangban aristocracy of the Joseon Dynasty, but it remains in use today. There are approximately 241 such clans claimed by South Koreans. Most people with surname Yi in Korea belong to either the Jeonju or Gyeongju clans. Also, surnames Yi and Yi each have a different clans.

Jeonju clan

The founder of this clan was Yi Han, a native of Baekje who later married a Silla princess and became a high-ranking official in Silla. His 22nd-generation descendant, Yi Seong-gye, went on to found the Joseon Dynasty. The House of Yi ruled the country for 518 years (between 1392 and 1910) and established many of the cultural, artistic and linguistic foundations for modern-day Korea.

During its reign, the House of Yi consolidated its effective rule over the territory of current Korea, encouraged the entrenchment of Confucian ideals and doctrines in Korean society, imported and adapted Chinese culture, and promoted classical Korean culture, trade, science, literature, and technology.

, the pretender to the Joseon throne is Yi Seok. Members of the different branches of Jeonju Yi survived until the formation of the current Republic of Korea. Many families claim membership in the House of Yi, but few actually descend from this lineage. South Korea's first president, Syngman Rhee, claims descent from the lineage.

Gyeongju clan

The founder of the Gyeongju clan was Yi Al-pyeong, one of the village headmen who chose Park Hyeokgeose as the first King of Silla. According to the Samguk Sagi, the Yi name was officially bestowed on the family by King Yuri around 9 CE.

Notable present-day members of this clan includes: Lee "Faker" Sang-hyeok (professional League of Legends player and mid-laner for T1), Lee "Gumayusi" Min-hyeong (professional League of Legends player and bot-laner for T1), Lee Je-no (member of the South Korean boy group NCT), Lee Byung-chul (founder of Samsung Group), Lee Kun-hee (the late Samsung Chairman) and Lee Myung-bak (former president of South Korea). 

The Gyeongju Yi clan, according to the 2000 South Korean census, numbered over 1.4 million individuals, making it the most numerous of the clans that bear the surname Yi.

Pyeongchang clan
The founder of the Pyeongchang clan was Yi Gwang, an official and military commander during the Joseon Dynasty. Yi Seung-hun, who was the first person that brought Catholicism to Korea, was a member of this clan. This was an yangban clan, founded somewhere between 1580 and 1607.

Deoksu clan
The founder of this clan was Yi Dong-su, an official of the Goryeo period. This was a prominent yangban clan during the Joseon Dynasty, producing figures including the legendary admiral Yi Sun-shin and the highly influential government official and philosopher Yi I. The clan takes immense pride in producing both Korea's top military commander and arguably top scholar. Both Yi Sun-shin and Yi I are depicted on South Korea's money and have taekwondo forms named in their honor. The clan seat, corresponds to Deoksu-hyeon, an old division of what is now Kaep'ung County, North Korea.

Jinbo clan
The Jinbo Yi clan was known for the famous Joseon scholar Yi Hwang, who founded the Yeongnam School and started a private Confucian academy.  He also became one of the 18 Sages of Korea (동방 18현). The progenitor of this clan was Yi Seok of the Goryeo Dynasty.

Yongin clan
The founder of the Yongin clan was Yi Gil-gwon, who helped in the foundation of Goryeo. Yi Il, a general during the Imjin War, was a member of this clan.

Yeoju clan
Prominent members of this clan include the Joseon philosopher Yi Ik.

Danyang clan
The founder of this clan was Yi Bae-hwan. A prominent member of this clan was Yi Yun-yong, who was the acting Prime Minister of South Korea in 1952.

Yangsan clan
The founder of this clan was Yi Man-yeong, who was a minister after the fall of the Goryeo Dynasty. He died of strangulation near an isolated mountain.

Suan clan
The founder of this clan was Yi Gyeon-ung, one of the founders of Goryeo.

Seongju clan
The founder of this clan was Yi Sun-yu, a prominent official of late Silla. His 12th-generation descendant, Yi Jang-gyeong, was also a prominent official during the Goryeo Dynasty. Eight generations of Jang Kyung's descendants yielded 75 civil examination qualifiers. As of the 2000 census, 186,188 Koreans of the Seongju Yi clan live in South Korea.

Hongju clan
The founder of the Hongju Yi clan was Yi Yu-seong, a member of the King's inner circle during late Goryeo. The clan's ancestral seat was bestowed when his 9th generation descendant, Yi Gi-jong, was titled. Hongyang/Hongju is located in present-day Hongseong County, South Chungcheong Province. Especially during the late Goryeo and early Joseon Dynasties, the Hongju Yi clan produced many outstanding and influential people, including Yi Yeon-su, Yi Seong, Yi Seo, and Yi Jong-jang.

Yeonan clan
The Yeonan Yi clan were aristocrats during the Joseon Dynasty. Several members were Chief State Councillors. The clan also had a high number of Chief Scholars during that period. The progenitor was Yi Mu, who came from Tang China.

Hansan clan
It is based in Hansan-myeon, Seocheon County, South Chungcheong Province. There are two different branches (Hojanggong family and Kwonjigong family). The founder of this clan is Yi Yoon-kyung. One member of the clan is Yi Saek, a Confucian scholar during late Goryeo. He founded an academy that educated the founders of Joseon. The Hansan Yi clan also produced many scholars in the Joseon Dynasty such as Yi San-hae. Modern figures belonging to Hansan Yi clan include Yi Sang-jae, an independence activist during the Japanese occupation.

People with the surname

See also
 List of South Korean surnames by prevalence

References

Korean-language surnames
Surnames of Korean origin
it:Lee (cognome)
vi:Lý (họ)